The fixture between football clubs IFK Göteborg and Örgryte IS is a local derby in Gothenburg, Sweden and a fierce rivalry. The derby does not have a unique name and is commonly known by the collective term Göteborgsderby which is also used for other fixtures between Gothenburg clubs. 

Due to the long history of both clubs, no other rivals in Swedish football have played each other more times (including friendly matches), and the record attendance for Swedish club football was set at a derby in 1959.

Background
Örgryte IS is one of the oldest clubs in Sweden, founded in 1887, and played the first Swedish football match by association rules in 1892. They dominated Swedish football during the 1890s and 1900s, winning 10 of their 14 Swedish championships during that era. IFK Göteborg was founded in 1904 and won its first competitive match against Örgryte in 1910. Since then, IFK have been the dominant team and has won 18 Swedish championships as well as two UEFA Cup titles.

Honours

Matches

Sources:

League

IFK Göteborg at home

Örgryte IS at home

Cup

Other competitions

Records

Sources:

Biggest wins

Highest scoring matches

Longest win streak

Longest unbeaten streak

Highest attendances

Shared player and manager history

Played for both

Played for one, managed one

Torbjörn Nilsson is the current caretaker assistant manager of IFK Göteborg, but has only had the head manager role for Örgryte IS.

Played for both, managed one

Played for one, managed both

Played for both, managed both

Managed both

Notes

Citations

References

External links
Sveriges Fotbollshistoriker och Statistiker – Statistics for all Allsvenskan and Svenska Cupen matches
IFK Göteborg official website
Örgryte IS official website

IFK Göteborg
Örgryte IS
Football derbies in Sweden